Flirting with Forty is a 2008 American romantic comedy-drama television film directed by Mikael Salomon from a screenplay by Julia Dahl, based on the novel of the same name by Jane Porter. Starring Heather Locklear and Robert Buckley, the film premiered on Lifetime on December 6, 2008.

The film focuses on Jackie (Locklear), a divorced mother who travels to Hawaii for her 40th birthday and meets a young surf instructor named Kyle (Buckley). The two flirt and Kyle teaches Jackie how to surf. Complications develop because the two are living in different parts of the world.

Premise
Jackie Laurens is a recently divorced, 40-year-old and mother of a teenage son and daughter who takes a vacation alone to Hawaii where, against her better judgment, she meets and hooks up with hunky, 27-year-old resident surf instructor Kyle Hamilton. However, what began as a one-night stand turns into love, with Jackie flying to Hawaii every chance she has to meet with her latest love interest, which is soon met with disapproval from her ex-husband, her children, and even her close friends. As time and the pressure from everyone around her to end things with Kyle pushes Jackie to her breaking point, it will only take her beau Kyle to teach her how to cope before life passes her by.

Cast
 Heather Locklear as Jackie Laurens
 Robert Buckley as Kyle Hamilton, Jackie's new Hawaiian boyfriend
 Vanessa Williams as Kristine, Jackie's best friend
 Cameron Bancroft as Daniel Laurens, Jackie's former husband
 Sam Duke as Will Laurens, Jackie and Daniel's son
 Jamie Bloch as Jessica Laurens, Jackie and Daniel's daughter
 Christy Greene as Melinda, Daniel's girlfriend
 Anne Hawthorne as Clare, Jackie's client
 Chelah Horsdal as Annie, Jackie's friend
 Stefanie von Pfetten as Nicole, Jackie's friend
 Ted Whittall as Dr. Sonnet
 James Bright as Tommy
 Thomas Meharey as Andrew

References

External links
 

2008 television films
2008 films
2008 comedy-drama films
2008 romantic comedy-drama films
American romantic comedy-drama films
American comedy-drama television films
Films about families
Films about vacationing
Films based on American novels
Films based on romance novels
Films directed by Mikael Salomon
Films set in Hawaii
Films shot in Calgary
Films shot in Honolulu
Lifetime (TV network) films
Romance television films
2000s English-language films
2000s American films